Monte Richards Ledbetter (born August 13, 1943) is a former American football wide receiver who played three seasons in the American Football League (AFL) with the Houston Oilers and Buffalo Bills. He was drafted by the Oilers in the eleventh round of the 1966 AFL Draft. He was also drafted by the Cleveland Browns in the tenth round of the 1966 NFL Draft. Ledbetter played college football at Northwestern State University and attended Roanoke High School in Roanoke, Louisiana. He was also of the Atlanta Falcons of the National Football League (NFL).

References

External links
Just Sports Stats

Living people
1943 births
Players of American football from Louisiana
American football wide receivers
Northwestern State Demons football players
Houston Oilers players
Buffalo Bills players
Atlanta Falcons players
People from Jennings, Louisiana